The Ministry of Justice and Human Rights of Ivory Coast is a department of the government of Ivory Coast. According to statute, the ministry audits the judicial hierarchy via its Central Administration unit, and executes a rating and appraisal system to determine which judicial officer will advance in rank. The ministry also has other responsibilities such as overseeing the National Chamber of Bailiffs of Ivory Coast.

List of ministers (Post-1960 upon achieving independence) 

 Germain Coffi Gadeau (1960–1963)
 Nanlo Bamba (1963-1966)
 Camille Alliali (1966–1983)
 Lanzeni Coulibaly (1984–1986)
 Noel Nemin (1987–1990) [also served as Attorney General]
Jacqueline Oble (1991–1994) [1st female]
 Faustin Kouame (1994–1996)
 Jean Kouakou Brou (1996–1999)
 Essy N'gatta (2000)
 Siene Oulai (2001–2002)
 Desire Asenyini Tagro (2002–2003)
Henriette Diabate (2003–2006)
 Mamadou Kone (2006–2010)
Jeannot Kouadio Ahoussou (2011–2012)
 Gnenema Mamadou Coulibaly (2012–2017)
 Sansan Kambile (2017–present)

See also 

 Justice ministry
 Politics of Ivory Coast

References 

Justice ministries
Justice